Pioneer Works is a non-profit cultural center in Red Hook, New York City. The center builds community through the arts and sciences to create an open and inspired world. It encourages radical thinking across disciplines by providing practitioners a space to work, tools to create, and a platform to exchange ideas that are free and open to all. 85% of its funds are spent on free programming.

History

Pioneer Works was founded by artist Dustin Yellin who purchased a colossal brick building in Red Hook in 2010. Yellin’s artistic aim was to improve the culture as a whole, and he sought to provide a place where a variety of thinkers and artists could readily converge.    Dustin Yellin acquired the building in 2011, and renovated it with Gabriel Florenz, Pioneer Works’ Founding Artistic Director, and a team of artists, supporters, and advisors. Together, they established Pioneer Works as a 501c3 nonprofit in 2012. In June 2012, Pioneer Works first opened its doors to the public.

Program initiatives

Exhibitions
The exhibition program revolves around an expansive, main space that acts as a major exhibit hall. There are also several smaller enclosed exhibition spaces for special projects.

Exhibits reflect Pioneer Works’ collaborative ethos, and the program is not driven by a single curatorial voice.

Curators from a variety of backgrounds may work together on single exhibition.  Featured work displays a broad theoretical range, uses a variety of media, and indicates willingness to experiment with content and process.

Pioneer Works attempts to show work without regard to an artist's reputation or standing in the art community.

Events

Special lectures, performances, and events serve as the backbone of the creative culture of Pioneer Works.  Specialists from diverse backgrounds present work in a number of different ways, from traditional lectures to films to art installations and performances.

Musical performances are frequent and range from single performances to festivals.

Residencies

The Pioneer Works residency program aims to nurture creative practices while supporting emerging artists. Housed within the facility, the program immerses artists in an environment that supports interdisciplinary discourse. The creative facilities available include a 3-D printer, a powerful microscope capable of printing the viewed image, a metalworking shop, a woodworking shop, an analog photography studio, and a music studio.

Visual and performing artists—along with writers, musicians, designers, and scientists—are encouraged to share their ideas in a public presentation of their work produced over the course of the residency.

Educational classes

Instructors explore both modern and distinctive traditional topics in an atypical style, encouraging students to creatively interpret the psychic and natural worlds using a variety of specialized tools and techniques. The goal is not to memorize information or mechanize process, but to synthesize the teachings of experts in various disciplines into a broad capacity to learn for oneself.  There is no standardized curriculum per se, and although the fields of the arts and sciences are prevalent, courses range from circuitry design to specialized courses like lock-picking and advice on how to fake one’s own death.

Science program

The science program aims to dismantle artificial institutional barriers between the arts and sciences, and in the process, to fuse technology, imagination, and experimental rigor.  The program at Pioneer Works reunites the arts and sciences to help place particular problems into a broader cultural context.  For example, how can we best understand the implications of modern genetics and rapidly evolving technology upon learning, the environment and social communication?  A purely scientific model may not provide a complete response. Janna Levin, professor of physics and astronomy at Barnard College, serves as Director and Chair of Sciences.

The Pioneer Works Science Studios invites scientific minds to explore unsolved quandaries and to engage in public discourse. One of its signature programs is Scientific Controversies. The program has hosted geneticist George Church, oncologist Sidhartha Mukarjee, Nobel Prize winner Rainer Weiss, and evolutionary biologist Richard Dawkins. The program also provides Ph.D. researchers, programmers, physicists, biologists and chemists with equipment for experimentation.  Work ranges from algorithmic data mining to nanoscience and artificial intelligence. Nano-physicist Matthew Putman Ph.D. serves on the board of directors.

Those awarded residents are given unfettered access to the Pioneer Works facilities and a community of visual artists, authors, musicians, and scientists.

Publications

Pioneer Works publishes Pioneer Works Journal (formerly Intercourse Magazine), an independent periodical committed to providing a genuine voice for modern art and culture, featuring a broad range of content and contributors. The magazine is currently available at local bookstores and at its website.

Other publishing efforts include books about individual artists.

Pioneer Works also acts as a small press for artists, authors, and other innovators who receive funding for approved projects.

The site

Building

The renovation of its home building was the first major project for Pioneer Works. The intention was to restore the building’s historic fundamental architecture while modernizing its internal systems to adapt to public use.  The fields of historic restoration, environmental design, and modern architecture converged in efforts to create the space, giving form to an open, soaring gallery of light.

Constructed in 1866 to house Pioneer Iron Works, the building was originally a factory for constructing large scale machines required by industry, including railroad tracks and machinery for sugar plantations.  With a footprint of half an acre, it was one of the largest machine manufacturers in the United States. The building was burned to the ground by a devastating fire in 1881 and rebuilt shortly thereafter, operating until the end of WWII.  The factory was a landmark that ultimately gave Pioneer Street its name.

Because the building is enormous, with an interior of roughly 27,000 square feet—including a ceiling height of 40' -- changes to the structure have been a formidable undertaking.  Architect Sam Trimble tackled the problem.  His renovation design added 100 windows, each almost 20 square feet.

The interior walls were stripped, revealing vast stretches of original brick that was then re-pointed.  Over eighty wooden joists were replaced. A wooden bridge crane (a gantry) running throughout the entire space was restored to operation.

When the floor was being installed, restoration gave way to energy-efficient modern technology. The poured concrete floor was embedded with coils flushed with hot water heated by high-efficiency boilers.  The use of radiant heat considerably reduces the environmental impact of acclimatizing the space.

The second floor is occupied by residents or those otherwise involved with the management of the Foundation.  Overlooking the downstairs gallery, studios with large windows encourage communication during the creative process.

Perpendicular to these studios, open walls framed by diagonal beams and windows enclose a larger space overlooking the main gallery.

On the mezzanine of the third floor are five more studio spaces (from 18'x 18’ to 34'x 18') and an enclosed science laboratory.

The Garden at Pioneer Works

Initially, the half-acre garden was filled with debris, boulders, and years of accumulated trash.  This was stripped and cleaned until it was suitable for the installation of a garden.  The main garden was initially designed by South Carolina landscape designer Taylor Drayton Nelson of Magnolia Gardens. Over the next several growing seasons, the basic structure of the garden was formalized through patterns of everyday use, and eventually large plants were added.

The garden itself has an open plan, with a central gravel picnic area surrounded by grassy, tree-covered hills.  A tunnel through a hill gives novel access to the periphery, and irregular stone paths carry the visitor abroad amongst evergreens and cherries. A swinging, double entrance gate, built from scrap materials on site, provides a public entryway directly from the street.   Sculpture from various artists complements nature’s efforts.

Just beyond the garden, a welding and fabrication studio is housed in shipping containers.  Four containers have been converted to a two-story usable space.  Downstairs, a bar and restaurant operate during events and performances.  Second-floor access is provided by an outdoor spiral staircase.  Upstairs is home to a music studio.

Hurricane Sandy (2012)

Months after much of the initial restoration was completed, five feet of water flooded the space, severely damaging the ground floor and halting development.  The damage from Hurricane Sandy was extensive, and many of those living and working nearby suffered unexpected loss from the storm.

At Pioneer Works, 3200 square feet of drywall was ruined.  All ground-floor windows had to be refurbished.  The wood shop, metal shop, and most equipment and machinery needed to be completely replaced. The bathrooms, only recently completed, had to be rebuilt.  The facility was without electricity for two months.

After the flood, staff rallied to clean and rebuild the space.  The garden was in disarray, with trees toppled and newly installed beds destroyed.  Over a dozen trees were lost and entire sections of the garden were replanted with evergreen trees and new shrubs. The garden was partially redesigned. During the clean-up, Pioneer held a 200-person nighttime event using LED lighting.

References

External links 

Artist residencies
Contemporary art galleries in the United States
Art museums established in 2012
Art museums and galleries in New York City
2012 establishments in New York City
Red Hook, Brooklyn
Museums in Brooklyn